Sinda is a constituency of the National Assembly of Zambia. It covers Sinda in Sinda District of Eastern Province.

List of MPs

References

Constituencies of the National Assembly of Zambia
1991 establishments in Zambia
Constituencies established in 1991